Miller Nunatak is a sharp pointed nunatak rising above the ice at the lower end of Campbell Glacier,  east-southeast of Mount Dickason, in Victoria Land, Antarctica. It was mapped by the United States Geological Survey from surveys and U.S. Navy air photos, 1955–63, and was named by the Advisory Committee on Antarctic Names for Herman T. Miller, a biologist at McMurdo Station in the 1965–66 season.

References

Nunataks of Victoria Land
Scott Coast